Nordkapp (North Cape) is the northernmost point of Jan Mayen, located at the northeastern extreme of the island. The cape is some 490 km east of eastern Greenland, 880 km west northwest of mainland Norway (Lofoten) and 950 km southwest of Sørkapp, Svalbard.

References

Headlands of Jan Mayen
Headlands of Norway